Eckford may refer to:

People 
 Elizabeth Eckford (born 1941), one of the Little Rock Nine group of African-American students
 Henry Eckford (horticulturist) (1823–1905), British plant breeder
 Henry Eckford (shipbuilder) (1775–1832), Scottish-born American naval architect and shipbuilder
 Joseph Eckford (1814–1884), Australian politician
 James Eckford Lauder (1811–1869), Scottish artist
 Maggie Eckford (born c. 1986), American singer-songwriter better known by her stage name Ruelle (singer)
 Tyler Eckford (born 1985), Canadian professional ice hockey player

Places 
 Eckford, Scottish Borders, a village in Roxburghshire, Scotland
 The Eckford chain of lakes in the Adirondack Mountains in the United States
 Eckford Township, Michigan, a civil township in Calhoun County, Michigan, in the United States

Ships 
 PS Henry Eckford, an American commercial steamship in service from 1824 to 1841, the first steamship with a compound engine
 , a United States Navy fleet replenishment oiler launched in 1989 and scrapped while still incomplete in 2011

Sports 
 Eckford of Brooklyn, an American baseball club in Brooklyn, New York, that played from 1855 to 1872